Munji may refer to:
 Munji language
 Munji, Afghanistan
 Munji people, the people who speak the language
 Munji Downs, a homestead in Western Australia
 Titus Munji, a marathon runner from Kenya
Munji 4 Life